Club Deportivo Arcense Ciudad Arce, commonly known as C.D. Arcense  are a Salvadoran professional football club based in Ciudad Arce.

History
In 15 April 2002, Arcense won promotion to the Salvadoran Primera División for the first time in the history after defeating Atletico Chaparrastique 2-0, with goals from Willian López and Sixto Vigil. 

but were relegated again after the 2003/2004 season. Despite winning two out of their last three games in 2013, Arcense were relegated to the Salvadoran Third Division.

League and Playoffs Performance
(2003 Apertura-Clausura 2004)

List of Coaches

  Cesar Acevedo (1992–1995)
  Juan Ramón Sánchez (1995–1996)
  Ricardo "Coneja" Guardado (2002)
  Raul Hector Donsanti (2003)
  Andres Novares (2003)
  Luis Ángel Navarro (2004)
  Jorge Salazar (2005)
  Raúl Corcio Zavaleti (2006)
  Luis Ángel Navarro
  Salvador Hernández (2011)
  Ignacio Cartagena (2012–)
  Ricardo Mena Laguán
  Jorge Tupinambá dos Santos
  Tomas Good Lopez

References

External links
Profile – La Prensa Gráfica 

Arcense
Arcense
1990 establishments in El Salvador